Ayda may refer to:
 Ayda (name) Persian variant of the Turkish name  
 Ayda, Iran, a village in Khuzestan Province, Iran